Horace Greeley (1811–1872) was editor of the New-York Tribune and an 1872 presidential candidate.


People
 Hjalmar Horace Greeley Schacht (1877–1970), German economist and politician

Sculptures
 Statue of Horace Greeley (City Hall Park), Manhattan, New York
 Statue of Horace Greeley (Herald Square), Manhattan, New York

Other uses
 Horace Greeley High School, Chappaqua, New York
 Horace Greeley Award, New England award for public service journalism

See also
 Tributes to Horace Greeley
 Horace Greeley presidential campaign, 1872